Pascual García Peña (1910–1977) was a Mexican film actor.

He was married to actress Hortensia Santoveña.

Selected filmography
 Madam Temptation (1948)
 The Big Steal (1949)
 Midnight (1949)
 Angels of the Arrabal (1949)
 The Woman of the Port (1949)
 Hypocrite (1949)
 In the Palm of Your Hand (1951)
 Oh Darling! Look What You've Done! (1951)
 The Masked Tiger (1951)
 Love for Sale (1951)
 Arrabalera (1951)
 My Man and I (1952)
 The Atomic Fireman (1952)
 The Beautiful Dreamer (1952)
 Passionflower (1952)
 City of Bad Men (1953)
 A Life in the Balance (1955)
 The Beast of Hollow Mountain (1956)
 The Black Scorpion (1957)
 The Boxer (1958)
 Black Skull (1960)

References

Bibliography 
 Rogelio Agrasánchez. Guillermo Calles: A Biography of the Actor and Mexican Cinema Pioneer. McFarland, 2010.

External links 
 

1910 births
1977 deaths
Mexican male film actors
People from San Luis Potosí